Drasteriodes is a genus of moths of the family Noctuidae. The genus was erected by George Hampson in 1926.

Species
 Drasteriodes ellisoni Wiltshire, 1977
 Drasteriodes elongata A. Bang-Haas 1910
 Drasteriodes eurytaenia Wiltshire, 1979
 Drasteriodes kisilkumensis Ershov, 1874
 Drasteriodes leprosa Brandt, 1938
 Drasteriodes limata Christoph, 1884
 Drasteriodes luxurians Wiltshire, 1971
 Drasteriodes medialis Hampson, 1908

References

Calpinae